Samuel Morrison may refer to:
 Samuel Morrison (taekwondo) (born 1990), Filipino taekwondo practitioner
 Samuel C. Morrison Jr. (born 1982), Liberian-born screenwriter, director, producer and journalist
 Samuel F. Morrison (born 1936), American librarian

See also
 Sam Morrison, American jazz saxophonist
 Sunshine Sammy Morrison (1912–1989), American child actor
 Samuel Morison (disambiguation)